Italy has participated in all editions of the World Mountain Running Championships, since the first edition of 1985 World Mountain Running Championships.

Men

Individual

Medal table individual

Medal table team

Women

Individual

Medal table individual

Medal table team

See also
 Italy at the European Mountain Running Championships

References

External links
 World Athletic Association
 FIDAL - Federazione Italyna Di Atletica Leggera

Athletics in Italy